Fernix Thomas (born 26 September 1980) is a Dominican cricketer. He played in twenty-six first-class and fourteen List A matches for the Windward Islands from 1999 to 2005.

See also
 List of Windward Islands first-class cricketers

References

External links
 

1980 births
Living people
Dominica cricketers
Windward Islands cricketers